Lampropteryx otregiata, the Devon carpet, is a moth of the family Geometridae. It is found from western Europe (from Scandinavia south to the Alps) to Japan and the Kuril Islands.

The wingspan is 27–30 mm. There are two generations per year, with adults on wing in May and June and again in August and September.

The larvae feed on Asperula and Galium species (including Galium palustre and Galium uliginosum). Larvae can be found from July to August. It overwinters in the pupal stage.

Subspecies
Lampropteryx otregiata otregiata
Lampropteryx otregiata dubitatrix (Bryk, 1942)

Similar species
Lampropteryx suffumata

References

External links
Lepiforum.de

Cidariini
Moths described in 1917
Moths of Asia
Moths of Europe